Begum Akhtar (1914–1974) was an Indian Best ghazal singer.

Begum Akhtar may also refer to:

 Sardar Akhtar (1915–1984), also known as Begum Akhtar, Indian film actress most known for the 1940 film Aurat
 Begum Akhtar Sulaiman (1922–1982), Pakistani social worker, political activist and daughter of Huseyn Shaheed Suhraward
 Begum Akhtar Riazuddin (born 1928), Pakistani activist and writer
 Begum Akhtar Jahan (born 1952), Bangladeshi politician

See also